Peet Aren (29 June 1889 Odiste, Võisiku Parish – 26 January 1970 New York City) was an Estonian painter, theatre artist, and graphic artist.

From 1908 to 1913, he studied at the Society for the Encouragement of Artists in St. Petersburg. From 1920 to 1925, he was a teacher at the State Industrial Art School in Tallinn. From 1926 to 1930, he taught at the Pallas Art School in Tartu.

In the 1930s he worked mainly as a graphic artist.

He designed the emblem of the Estonian Drama Theatre.  He is also designed the Cross of Liberty.

In 1944 he escaped to Germany. From 1949 onward he lived in New York City.

References

1889 births
1970 deaths
20th-century Estonian painters
20th-century Estonian male artists
Estonian World War II refugees
Estonian emigrants to the United States
People from Viljandi Parish